Šaukėnai   is a village in Šiauliai County in northern-central Lithuania. In 2011 it had a population of 596.

Šaukėnai has Šaukėnų Holy Trinity masonry church (built in 1989), a high school, a library, a post office (ZIP code: 86043), an ethnography museum and Šaukėnai manor with park.

History
On July 31, 1941, 273 to 300 Jews from the village were murdered by an Einsatzgruppen of Germans and Lithuanian nationalists in a mass execution.
They were mostly men, the women and children were taken to Žagarė ghetto.

References
This article was initially translated from the Lithuanian Wikipedia.

Towns in Lithuania
Towns in Šiauliai County
Holocaust locations in Lithuania